Ramazan pidesi (Turkish for Ramadan pita) is a traditional soft leavened Turkish bread.

Round and rather flat in form, and having a weave-like patterned crust, Ramazan pidesi is made of wheat flour with yeast, and topped with sesame and Nigella sativa seeds.

It is traditionally served for the iftar and sahur meals during the holy month of Ramadan.

See also 

 Matnakash from Armenia
 Naan
 Pita
 Barbari bread from Iran
 Tonis Puri
 Lagana

References 

Turkish cuisine
Breads
Bosnia and Herzegovina cuisine